Okada Air was an airline based in Benin City, Nigeria. The carrier was established in 1983 with a fleet of BAC-One Eleven 300s. and started charter operations in  the same year. In 1984, a Boeing 707-355C was acquired for cargo operations. By 1990, ten BAC One-Elevens were bought, and eight more were acquired in 1991. The company was granted the right of operating international flights in 1992.

The owner of Okada Air was Chief Gabriel Igbinedion, the Esama of Benin. In 1997, the company was disestablished.

Destinations
Okada Air served the following destinations throughout its history:

AbujaNnamdi Azikiwe International Airport
BeninBenin Airport
EnuguAkanu Ibiam International Airport
JosYakubu Gowon Airport
KadunaKaduna Airport
KanoMallam Aminu Kano International Airport
LagosMurtala Muhammed International Airport
Port HarcourtPort Harcourt International Airport
YolaYola Airport

Historical fleet details 

 BAC One-Eleven-200
 BAC One-Eleven-300
 BAC One-Eleven-400
 BAC One-Eleven-500
 Boeing 727-200
 Boeing 707-300
 Boeing 747-100
 Douglas DC-8-62
 Sud Aviation Caravelle
 Dornier 228-100
 PZL W-3 Sokół (one)

Accidents and incidents

Fatal accidents
There were three fatalities, all of them passengers. The aircraft had been diverted from the original Benin City–Kano route because of bad weather at the airport of destination.

Non-fatal hull-losses
7 September 1989: A BAC One-Eleven 320AZ, registration 5N-AOT, that was finalising a domestic scheduled Lagos–Port Harcourt passenger service, was written off on a hard landing caused by bad weather at Port Harcourt Airport.
1992: A Dornier 228-100, registration 5N-NOR, resulted damaged beyond repair on landing at an unknown location in Nigeria.

See also

Transportation in Nigeria

References

Bibliography

Defunct airlines of Nigeria
Airlines established in 1983
Airlines disestablished in 1997
Benin City
1983 establishments in Nigeria
1997 disestablishments in Africa
1990s disestablishments in Nigeria